St. George's Grammar School is a private co-educational day school located in Mowbray, a suburb of Cape Town, South Africa.  It was historically the cathedral school attached to St. George's Cathedral, having been founded in 1848 by Robert Gray, the first Anglican Bishop of Cape Town. St. George's claims to be the oldest independent school in South Africa.

Notable staff 

 Barry Smith

Notable alumni 

William Carlsson (1892–1916), first-class cricketer
Michael Brimer (OG 1947) (born 8 August 1933) is a pianist, organist, conductor, composer, musicologist, and academic.
Jack Plimsoll (OG 1935), was a South African cricketer who played in one Test in 1947, against England in Manchester.
Roy Clare (OG 1966), Royal Navy admiral
 Sir Nigel Hawthorne, English actor
Christopher Steytler (OG 1966), Former Judge of the Supreme Court of Western Australia and President of the Court of appeal
Nicholas Pike (OG 1973), a Hollywood composer in film and television
Rick Turner (OG 1959) (25 September 1941, in Stellenbosch – 8 January 1978, in Durban), a South African academic and anti-apartheid activist who was very probably assassinated by the apartheid state in 1978. Nelson Mandela described Turner "as a source of inspiration".
Clive Scott (OG 1955) (4 July 1937 – 28 July 2021) was a South African radio, film, television and theatre actor and director best known for his performances in the TV soap operas, The Villagers and Isidingo.

References

External links 

 

Private schools in the Western Cape
Anglican schools in South Africa
Schools in Cape Town
Educational institutions established in 1848
1848 establishments in the Cape Colony